Henry Mort (23 December 1818 – 6 September 1900) was a pastoralist, businessman, and politician in Queensland and New South Wales, Australia. He was a Member of the New South Wales Legislative Assembly and a Member of the New South Wales Legislative Council.

Early life 
Henry Mort was born on 23 December 1818 at Willowfield, Bolton, Lancashire, England, the son of Jonathon Mort and his wife Mary (née Sutcliffe). He was educated in Manchester and came to Australia in 1840.

From about 1841 to 1855 he was one of the pioneers in the Moreton Bay district (now the State of Queensland) working on pastoral stations. He was manager of Cressbrook Station in the Brisbane River Valley for David Cannon McConnel. Then in 1849, his brother Thomas Sutcliffe Mort leased the Laidley Plains pastoral station and appointed Henry Mort as manager. Henry Mort converted the station from sheep to cattle. In 1852, Henry Mort and his brother-in-law James Laidley took over the lease with Mort managing the Franklyn Vale portion of the station.

On 6 My 1846 he married Maria Laidley, the daughter of James Laidley (senior), in St James' Church, Sydney.

In 1855, Henry Mort moved to Sydney and became a partner in his brother's woolbroking business Mort & Co, later Goldsbrough Mort & Co. He was involved in many insurance companies and banks and one of the promoters of the Sydney Meat Preserving Company.

Politics
Mort represented West Moreton (then part of New South Wales) in the New South Wales Legislative Assembly from June 1859 to the seat's abolition with the separation of Queensland in December 1859. He then represented West Macquarie from December 1859 to November 1860. He was appointed a lifetime Member of the New South Wales Legislative Council on 22 Aug 1882.

Later life
Henry Mort donated £3,000 to the construction of All Saints Anglican Church in Ocean Street, Woollahra; Mort lived in that street and his eldest son Henry Wallace Mort was the rector of the church.

Mort died from pneumonia at his residence Anglesea, Ocean Street, Woollahra, Sydney on 6 September 1900 aged 81 years. His funeral proceeded from his Woollahra residence to the All Saints Church and then to the St Jude's Church and Cemetery for burial.

Legacy

The now heritage-listed Franklyn Vale Homestead in Grandchester, Queensland was established on Henry Mort's Franklyn Vale property in the early 1870s for his daughter and son-in-law, Edward Crace. Henry Mort was an occasional visitor to the property.

The locality of Mount Mort in the vicinity of the homestead is named after the Mort family.

All Saints Anglican Church is a heritage building.

References

External links

 

Members of the New South Wales Legislative Assembly
1818 births
1900 deaths
Members of the New South Wales Legislative Council
19th-century Australian politicians